Dydnia  is a village in Brzozów County, Subcarpathian Voivodeship, in southeastern Poland. It is the seat of the gmina (administrative district) called Gmina Dydnia.

As of 2015, the village had a population of 1,600 inhabitants.

References

Villages in Brzozów County